Graig Fawr is a Site of Special Scientific Interest in the preserved county of Clwyd, north Wales, now in Denbighshire. It is 153 metres (502 feet) high and located near Prestatyn. It is owned by the National Trust.

See also
List of Sites of Special Scientific Interest in Clwyd

Sites of Special Scientific Interest in Clwyd
National Trust properties in Wales